Singleton is a town on the banks of the Hunter River in New South Wales, Australia. Singleton is 197 km (89 mi) north-north-west of Sydney, and 70 km (43 mi) north-west of Newcastle. At June 2018, Singleton had an urban population of 16,346.

Singleton's main urban area includes the town centre, Singleton Heights, Dunolly, Darlington, The Retreat, Wattle Ponds and Hunterview. Surrounding rural villages include Broke, Camberwell, Jerrys Plains, Goorangoola/Greenlands, Belford and Lower Belford.

Singleton is located on the north-eastern part of the geological structure known as the Sydney basin, which borders the New England region.

History

The traditional landowners of the land around what is now Singleton are the Wonnarua / Wanaruah people. The Wonnarua / Wanaruah people have occupied the land in the Upper Hunter Valley for over 30,000 years.

Singleton was established in the 1820s. In its early years, it was also called Patrick's Plains. The Main Northern railway line reached Singleton in 1863 and was the end of the line until 1869. The town retains many historic buildings, including the original courthouse built in 1841, various large churches and many traditional Australian pubs. The countryside surrounding Singleton contains an unusual number of fine old mansions, reflecting the aristocratic nature of land grants when the area was settled. They include 'Neotsfield' (1828), the elaborate 'Baroona' (1829), 'Abbey Green' (1865) and stunning 'Minimbah' (1877).

A Telegraph Office was opened in Singleton on 25 February 1861 during the construction of the first telegraph line to Queensland. That Office combined with the Post Office on 1 January 1870. In May 1942, the community celebrated the appointment of the town's first female Telegram Messenger – Miss Daphne Lambkins. She was one of the first female Messengers in the Commonwealth.

Singleton was subject to the major flooding of the Hunter River in 1955, causing extensive damage to the town. When the area was being settled, the government originally attempted to create a town at Whittingham in a flood-free area, but the town grew by the river nonetheless. An embankment was constructed following the 1955 floods to help protect the town against any future flooding.

Baroona 
It was built in 1829 with property being on 33 hectares. John Larnach built the 1600ha house on land owned by his father-in-law  James Mudie. Larnach and Mudie worked together on property with the helped of convict labour to create a prominent agricultural establishment producing wool, meat and wheat. He was assigned 64 convicts which 67% English, 25% Irish and a few from Scotland with a median age of 28 years old. A servant set fire to the estate in 1832. In 1893  it was given addition of spiral staircase, card room and a viewing terrace.

1833 Revolt 
In November 1833 six convicts decided  to revolt based on poor treatment with little provisions and floggings.  Larnach and Mudie were away from the property at the time washing sheep. The rebels stole  clothes, guns, food and horses. They held Emily Larnach hostage with several servants locking them in an outhouse. They also attempted to kill John Larnach  but he managed to escape to Henry Dangar's house. Five of six men involved the riots were sentenced to death. The months leading to the revolt nearly two thirds of the convicts had been flogged with one third of them being flogged multiple times. In the trail on December 1833 lead the convicts being charged with stealing from two dwelling houses, shooting with intent to kill, aiding and abetting an attempted murder. The inquiry produced little evidence of illegal work practice or servants and convicts being overworked.

Pelerin 
Located on  30 Edinburgh Avenue on 3370 sqm, Pelerin was built in the 1830s and is a stone-faced two storey building.  In 1899 it sustained major storm damage. The home was rebuilt for D H Dight who decided to retain its original name. It has 27 rooms including 5 bedrooms, 3 bathrooms, study, and a timber kitchen. It has cedar joinery with 15-inch skirting board with 11-foot ceilings.

Ardersier House and Garden 
The house was built in 1871 by Singleton's first mayor Alexander Munro. He named his property Ardersier after his birthplace in Scotland. It is a 1.26 ha property located at 48 Maitland Road. In 1981 it was listed in the National Trust. It has three bedrooms, two bathrooms, plus study and an attic of two large rooms.

Hambledon Hill 
Completed in 1865, the land was given on a free grant to brothers Edward, Henry and William Nowland in 1824. Located on 535 Hambledon Hill Road, the land is 50 acres and is currently owned by artist Dale Frank. It has 7 bedrooms and 5 bathrooms. It is a two-storey sandstock brick home on stone foundations with hipped slate roof, a deep stone paved verandah, with cast-iron balustrade and French Doors. Last sold in September 2007 for $720,000.

Population
According to the 2016 census of Population, there were 16,089 people in the Singleton urban area.
 Aboriginal and Torres Strait Islander people made up 6.2% of the population. 
 85.1% of people were born in Australia. The next most common countries of birth were New Zealand 2.2%, England 1.5%, Philippines 0.8% and South Africa 0.7%.   
 90.6% of people spoke only English at home. 
 The most common responses for religion were Anglican 29.0%, Catholic 25.0% and No Religion 23.1%.

Climate
Singleton experiences a humid subtropical climate (Köppen: Cfa, Trewartha: Cfal); with hot summers and mild winters; and with a moderately low precipitation amount of 652.7 millimetres (25.71 in). Precipitation is more abundant during the summer, as the town is affected by foehn winds during winter and spring. The highest temperature recorded at Singleton was 43.6 °C (110.5 °F) on the 15th of January 2001; the lowest recorded was -4.2 °C (24.4 °F) on the 16th of August 1994.

Transport
The town is located at the junction of the New England Highway and Putty Road. The Golden Highway branches northwest from the New England Highway ten kilometres south of Singleton. Singleton is also served by local and long-distance rail services. Singleton railway station on the Main Northern railway line is located at the southern end of the town center. There are also bus services, both intercity and local. A bypass for the New England Highway is planned to divert traffic from Singleton, more than 26,000 vehicles travel through Singleton daily, the environmental assessment and concept design are open to public feedback in 2019.

Economy
Major industries near Singleton include coal mining, electricity generation, light industry, vineyards, horse breeding and cattle production. Dairying was once a mainstay in the area, but has declined.

The largest employment industry is coal mining, which employs 24 percent of the town's workforce. Defence is the second largest employer with almost 4 percent of the workforce.

Media

Print
The Singleton Argus is a bi-weekly newspaper which was established in 1874. It is currently owned and published by Fairfax Media. The weekly newspaper that serves Singleton and the Hunter Valley is The Hunter Valley News, which, along with the Newcastle Herald newspaper (daily, except Sundays), is published by Fairfax Media.
The Hunter River Times was established in 2020 and provides news for the surrounding Singleton area.

Radio
Radio stations serving both Newcastle and the Hunter Valley can be received in Singleton.

Television
Singleton is part of the Newcastle-Hunter Region television market, which is served by 5 television networks, three commercial and two national services (which include new sub-channels that started in 2009 for the commercial networks and in recent years from the national services).

Tourism

 Sundial. Singleton is home to one of the world's largest sundials, presented by a local coal mine for the 1988 Bicentennial Celebrations.
 Wineries. The town is close to the famous Pokolbin wine region (southeast). There are also many wineries in the shire, especially around Broke.
 Boating. Lake St Clair is an artificial lake located to the north of the town, with facilities for boating and camping.
 National Parks. Wollemi and Yengo National Parks are located south of the town via the Putty Road. Barrington Tops National Park borders the north of the shire.
 Museums. Singleton has three main museums, the Singleton Historic Society Museum in Burdekin Park, the Royal Australian Infantry Corps Museum at the nearby barracks and the Mercy Convent Museum 'Sacred Spaces' within the grounds of the Convent of the Sisters of Mercy (Singleton).

Heritage listings
Singleton has a number of heritage-listed sites, including:
 25 Dangar Road: Singleton District Hospital
 25-27 George Street: Singleton Post Office
 88 George Street: Ewbank
 Main Northern railway: Singleton railway station
 Queen Street: St Patrick's Roman Catholic Church Cemetery

Education
Singleton is home to a number of educational facilities. These include schools operated by NSW Department of Education and two non-government schools at both Primary and Secondary levels; as well as a TAFE campus, Singleton Community College and a number of pre-schools. St Catherine's Catholic College provides classes from kindergarten to year 12, while Australian Christian College has classes from pre-kindergarten to year 12.

Schools operated by NSW Department of Education include:

 Broke Public School
 Jerrys Plains Public School
 King Street Public School
 Milbrodale Public School
 Kirkton Public School
 Mount Pleasant Public School
 Singleton Heights Public School
 Singleton Public School
 Singleton High School

Hunter Institute of TAFE operates a campus in Singleton. It provides training and further education as well as collaborating with secondary schools for students completing Senior years.

Notable people 
 Joseph Burnettborn in Singleton in 1899 and is best known as the Captain of the ill-fated , which was lost on 19 November 1941 in a battle with German auxiliary cruiser Kormoran
 Charles Duttona Queensland politician and great-great grandfather of Peter Dutton was born in Singleton
 Dale Frankan artist, was born and currently lives in Singleton
 Kerrod Hollanda rugby league player
 Joy McKeanan Australian country music matriarch, was born in Singleton in 1930
 Cherie Nowlana television and film producer, was born in Singleton, best known for directing the 1997 film Thank God He Met Lizzie
 Toby Pricethe 2016 Dakar Rally champion lives in Singleton
 Wendy Richardson a playwright, was born in Singleton in 1933
 Sean Ruddera rugby league player
 Josh Valentinea rugby union player
 Sir Charles Wadea former Premier of New South Wales, serving from 1907-1910, was born in Singleton

Sister city
 - Takahata, Yamagata, Japan

See also
 List of world's largest roadside attractions

References

External links

 
  Singleton Shire Council
 Tourist guide for Singleton - Visit NSW

 
Suburbs of Singleton Council
Towns in the Hunter Region
Hunter River (New South Wales)